Tseyendashiin Engüün (born 7 September 2000) is a Mongolian professional violinist, and singer. She is the winner of season 1 of The Voice of Mongolia at the age of 17. After winning the show, Engüün was signed to Mongol Content LLC.

Career 
At her age of 5, Engüün enrolled in Mongolian State Conservatory as a disciple of professional violinist Enkh. J who is a graduate of Komitas State Conservatory of Yerevan. Engüün graduated in Mongolian State Condervatory in 2020. She majored in Musician of String Music Orchestra.

The Voice 

Engüün mentioned on an interview that she always had a thought that she would enter if "The Voice" was organized in Mongolia. When Mongol TV announced that they were holding the show with official rights , she directly signed up for blind audition. It was her very first singing competition.

Performances on The Voice

Discography

References

Komitas State Conservatory of Yerevan alumni
People from Ulaanbaatar
2000 births
Living people
The Voice (franchise) winners